Bortigali is a comune (municipality) in the Province of Nuoro in the Italian region Sardinia, located about  north of Cagliari and about  west of Nuoro.

The municipality of Bortigali contains the frazione (subdivision) Mulargia.

Bortigali borders the following municipalities: Birori, Bolotana, Dualchi, Macomer, Silanus.

Demographic evolution

Climate

References

Cities and towns in Sardinia